Milan Vader (born 18 February 1996) is a Dutch cross-country mountain biker and road cyclist, who currently rides for UCI WorldTeam .

Major results

2013
 1st  National Junior XCO Championships
2015
 1st  National Under-23 XCO Championships
2016
 1st  National Under-23 XCO Championships
2019
 1st  National XCO Championships
 3rd  UEC European XCO Championships
2020
 1st  National XCO Championships
 French Cup
1st Alpe d'Huez
 2nd Overall UCI XCO World Cup
2nd Nové Město II
3rd Nové Město I
 Copa Catalana Internacional
2nd Barcelona
2021
 UCI XCC World Cup
3rd Leogang
 Internazionali d’Italia Series
3rd Andora

References

External links

1996 births
Living people
Dutch male cyclists
Dutch mountain bikers
Cross-country mountain bikers
People from Middelburg, Zeeland
Cyclists at the 2020 Summer Olympics
Olympic cyclists of the Netherlands
Cyclists from Zeeland